is a Japanese manga series written and illustrated by Goro Aizome. It was serialized in Takeshobo's seinen manga magazine Monthly Kissca from January 2014 to January 2022, and later transferred to the Web Comic Gamma Plus website in February 2022.

Plot
Sota Tachibana, a diminutive young man, discovers that his older sister, Kaoru, has roped him into becoming the hall director and coach for her college's women's volleyball team, which she is a member of. Among her teammates includes Ayano Hasekawa, a girl he has had a crush on for years. Once the team takes a liking to him, Sota has to deal with the situation.

Media

Manga
Written and illustrated by Goro Aizome, Do You Like Big Girls? began serialization in Takeshobo's seinen manga magazine Monthly Kissca on January 8, 2014. When Monthly Kissca ceased its publication on January 8, 2022, the manga was transferred over to the Web Comic Gamma Plus website on February 18 of the same year. Takeshobo has collected its chapters into individual tankōbon volumes. The first volume was released on October 7, 2014. As of June 23, 2022, eight volumes have been released.

In North America, Seven Seas Entertainment licensed the manga and it is being released under their Ghost Ship mature imprint. The first volume was released on October 5, 2021.

Volume list

Live-action film
A live-action film adaptation, starring Natsuki Senna and Rena Takei, was released in Japan on August 1, 2020.

Reception
As of August 2020, the manga had 500,000 copies in circulation.

References

External links
  
  
 

Manga adapted into films
Romantic comedy anime and manga
School life in anime and manga
Seinen manga
Seven Seas Entertainment titles
Takeshobo manga
Volleyball in anime and manga
Webcomics in print